Le Mont-Dore can refer to:

Le Mont-Dore (France), a commune in the Puy-de-Dôme department in Auvergne in central France. Formerly called Mont-Dore-les-Bains.
Le Mont-Dore (New Caledonia), a commune in the suburbs of Nouméa in the South Province of New Caledonia.